Ben McKown (born January 11, 1957) is an American former professional tennis player.

McKown, a native of Lakeland, Florida, won the national junior clay court championships in 1974 and was a junior quarter-finalist at Wimbledon the following year. He played collegiate tennis for Trinity University (Texas) and in 1979 partnered with Erick Iskersky to claim the NCAA Division I doubles championship.

In the early 1980s he competed briefly on the professional tour and reached a best ranking of 94 in the world. He made a main draw appearance at the 1981 French Open, where he lost in the first round to Jean-François Caujolle.

References

External links
 
 

1957 births
Living people
American male tennis players
Trinity Tigers men's tennis players
Tennis people from Florida
Sportspeople from Lakeland, Florida